Arthroleptides is a small genus of frogs in the family Petropedetidae. Their common name is rocky river frogs. They are found in the mountains of East Africa (Tanzania, Kenya, and probably Uganda). They have been considered to belong to Petropedetes, which after exclusion of Arthroleptides is restricted to Central Africa.

Arthroleptides species have distinct tympana and no external vocal sacs. Males have femoral glands, and in the breeding state, spiny nuptial excrescences. Tadpoles live on wet rocks out of water.

Species
The three species are:
 Arthroleptides dutoiti Loveridge, 1935
 Arthroleptides martiensseni Nieden, 1911 "1910"
 Arthroleptides yakusini Channing, Moyer, and Howell, 2002

Also, one undescribed species from the Nguru Mountains probably exists.

References

 
Petropedetidae
Amphibians of Sub-Saharan Africa
Amphibian genera
Taxa named by Fritz Nieden
Taxonomy articles created by Polbot